Khaybullino (Xäybulla) is a rural locality (a village) in Zigazinsky Selsoviet, Beloretsky District, Bashkortostan, Russia. The population was 27 as of 2010. There are 4 streets.

Geography 
Khaybullino is located 257 km west of Beloretsk (the district's administrative centre) by road. Bakeyevo is the nearest rural locality.

References 

Rural localities in Beloretsky District